Opium is the tenth studio album by Swedish trip hop musician Jay-Jay Johanson. It is his first album to be distributed through Kwaidan Records.

Track listing

Personnel
Jäje Johansson - vocals, bass guitar, drums, glockenspiel, guitars, organ, percussion, piano, trumpet, Wurlitzer, songwriting
Magnus Frykberg - bass guitar, string arrangements, keyboards, guitars, engineering, songwriting, mixing
Erik Jansson - bass guitar, guitars, piano, vocoder, Wurlitzer, songwriting
Robin Guthrie - string arrangements, songwriting, producing
Mattias Fornell - mastering
Sixten Delicata Johnsson - handclapping
Funkstörung - producing

References

Jay-Jay Johanson albums
2015 albums
Downtempo albums